The 2020 Piala Indonesia was supposed to be the eighth edition of the Piala Indonesia football tournament.

PSM would have been the defending champions.

The tournament was cancelled due to the COVID-19 pandemic.

See also 
 2020 Liga 1
 2020 Liga 2
 2020 Liga 3

References 

2020
Indonesia
Piala Indonesia
Football competitions in Indonesia
Piala Indonesia